The 1957 Sam Houston State Bearkats football team represented Sam Houston State Teachers College (now known as Sam Houston State University) as a member of the Lone Star Conference (LSC)  during the 1957 NCAA College Division football season. Led by sixth-year head coach Paul Pierce, the Bearkats compiled an overall record of 3–5–1 with a mark of 3–3–1 in conference play, and finished fourth in the LSC.

Schedule

References

Sam Houston State
Sam Houston Bearkats football seasons
Sam Houston State Bearkats football